Baikunthapur is a village in the Cooch Behar II CD block in the Cooch Behar Sadar subdivision of the Cooch Behar district in West Bengal, India

Geography

Location                                    

Area overview
The map alongside shows the north-central part of the district. It has the highest level of urbanisation in an overwhelming rural district. 22.08% of the population of the Cooch Behar Sadar subdivision lives in the urban areas and 77.92% lives in the rural areas. The entire district forms the flat alluvial flood plains of mighty rivers.
 
Note: The map alongside presents some of the notable locations in the subdivision. All places marked in the map are linked in the larger full screen map.

Demographics
As per the 2011 Census of India, Baikunthapur had a total population of 1,053.  There were 549 (52%) males and 504 (48%) females. There were 118 persons in the age range of 0 to 6 years. The total number of literate people in Haripur was 795 (85.03% of the population over 6 years).

Culture
The temple of Baikunthanth is situated around the place where the Damodardebdham once stood. It is a simple tin-roofed temple. There are ashtadhatu idols of Krishna and Balarama in the temple. The village was once home to many noble men.

References 

Villages in Cooch Behar district